Lixin is a county located in north-eastern Anhui province, China, under the jurisdiction of Bozhou City. It is a county famous for its education system and beef production. An agricultural county, the people of Lixin have depended on farming (mainly wheat) for hundreds of years. Recently, the industrialisation of China has forced many farmers to migrate to the cities for short-term jobs.

History
Lixin county is a fairly young geopolitical entity among those that have been many thousands of years in China. The creation of the county did not occur until the People's Republic of China was established in 1949.  In the late 1960s, Lixin was created by the combination of parts from three neighbouring counties: Guoyang, Mengcheng and Fuyang.

A county part of Fuyang city, Lixin was recently joined by six other counties to form the prefecture-level city, Bozhou.

Administrative divisions
Lixin County has 19 towns and 4 townships.
19 Towns

4 Townships

Climate

References

External links
Official website of Lixin County Government

Bozhou